Harald Christensen (9 April 1907 – 27 November 1994) was a Danish cyclist who competed in the 1932 Summer Olympics. He won a bronze medal in the tandem event.

References

1907 births
1994 deaths
Danish male cyclists
Olympic cyclists of Denmark
Cyclists at the 1932 Summer Olympics
Olympic bronze medalists for Denmark
Olympic medalists in cycling
People from Kolding
Medalists at the 1932 Summer Olympics
Sportspeople from the Region of Southern Denmark